Jung Won-jin is a South Korean football player who plays as a forward or midfielder for Busan I'Park FC in the K League 2.

Career 

Jung played college football for Yeungnam University.

Pohang Steelers
Jung joined Pohang Steelers in 2016 and made his professional debut against Urawa Red Diamonds in AFC Champions League on 2 March 2016. On 12 March 2016, he made his K League 1 debut against Gwangju FC.

Gyeongnam FC 
On 28 December 2016, Jung joined Gyeongnam FC on loan.

FC Seoul 
On 28 July 2018, Jung joined FC Seoul.

Club career statistics

References

External links 
 

1994 births
Living people
South Korean footballers
Association football forwards
Association football midfielders
Pohang Steelers players
Gyeongnam FC players
FC Seoul players
Gimcheon Sangmu FC players
K League 1 players
K League 2 players
Universiade silver medalists for South Korea
Universiade medalists in football